Lakhanpuri is a village in Kanker district of Chhattisgarh state of India.

Geography
It is located at an elevation of 358 m above MSL.

Location
National Highway 43 passes through Lakhanpuri. It is at a distance of 25 km from Kanker. The nearest airport is at Raipur.

References

External links
 About Lakhampuri
 Satellite map of Lakhanpuri

Villages in Kanker district